Henry Charles William Angelo (1756–1835) was an English memoirist and fencing master, as a member of the Angelo family of fencers and son of the Italian master, Domenico Angelo.

As the leader of his father's Angelo School of Arms from 1780 to 1817, he consolidated its status among London's high society, with upper class patronage and a cult of celebrity. He also maintained his family's reputation, reissuing his father's seminal fencing manual and composing several memoirs and a single work on fencing, himself.

Biography

Henry Charles William Malevolti was born on 5 April 1756 at St James's Place, Piccadilly, London. His baptismal surname was Malevolti, but in the late 1750s, he became known as Angelo, following his father's adoption of the surname. Angelo was born to the Italian-born fencing master, Domenico Angelo (1717–1802), and his wife, Elizabeth née Johnson (1738–1805). This placed Angelo in the second generation of the Angelo Family, a dynasty of fencing masters who "dominated Europe's fencing scene for well over 100 years", according to fencing master Nick Evangelista. 

Angelo grew up among four sisters and one brother, as the eldest child of the family. He attended the school is Chiswick, then run by Dr William Rose, then moving to Eton College (where his father taught fencing) as of 1764. In 1772, he began his formal training as a fencer, practicing swordsmanship under a Monsieur Motet in Paris, a man then known in the Continent as "the greatest living fencer", according to Egerton Castle. By 1775, he had returned to England to become his father's principal assistant.

On 23 October 1778, against the wishes of his family, he married Mary Bowman Swindon of West Auckland at St Anne's, Soho. They had their first child in 1799, with the Duke of York agreeing to be the child's godfather (the Duke already being Angelo's reputed godfather). Angelo had four sons, the second of whom, Henry Charles Angelo (1780–1852), became a fencing master himself, maintaining the family's reputation.

In 1780, Domenico Angelo retired from his fencing school, the Angelo School of Arms, and was supplanted by his son, Henry Angelo. Shortly after assuming control, Angelo moved the school's premises to Her Majesty's Theatre, Haymarket. Angelo specialised in cavalry swordsmanship, with his patrons including the London and Westminster Light Horse Volunteers. During his time, Angelo consolidated the academy's status within London high society, utilising a "combination of sportsmanship, celebrity, and royal and noble patronage", according to Malcolm Fare of the Oxford Dictionary of National Biography. Here, in 1787, Angelo's friend and popular caricaturist, Thomas Rowlandson, produced a set of watercolours depicting Angelo's swordsmanship, illustrating several of his most distinguished students looking on (including Charles James Fox and The Marquess of Buckingham). In 1787, Angelo reissued his father's L'école des armes (1763), with fencing illustrations copied from Diderot's Encyclopédie, under the title The School of Fencing. This volume has been described by Evangelista "the all-time classic volume on the subject of swordplay" and "a work of immense influence".

On 17 June 1789, Her Majesty's Theatre was burned down and Angelo was forced to move to new premises, in 13 Bond Street, which he occupied alongside the boxer John Jackson. Angelo did not settle during his final years of teaching, tutoring at around forty schools in total, before an injury by actor Edmund Kean in 1817 forced him into retirement. The management of the school was then passed to his son, Henry Charles Angelo. Angelo died at Twickenham in 1835.

In his retirement, Angelo was a memoirist and, like his father, a writer on fencing. In 1817, he reissued his father's School of Fencing, under the title A Treatise on the Utility and Advantages of Fencing, with a biography of his friend, the composer and fencer Chevalier de Saint-Georges, appended. He reminisced of his life in London's high society in two memoirs: The Reminiscences of Henry Angelo (1828) and Angelo's Pic Nic; or, Table Talk (1834), ignoring discussion of fencing career for more conventional anecdotes, many of questionable veracity. Angelo published one original work on fencing, Hungarian and Highland Broadsword (1798), illustrated with 24 watercolours by Rowlandson, many depicting Angelo on horseback.

References

Sources

Further reading

External links

Works
 The School of Fencing (1787)
 Reminiscences of Henry Angelo (1828) at the Internet Archive
 Angelo's Pic Nic (1834) at the Internet Archive
Portraits
 Rowlandson's prints of Henry Angelo at the Metropolitan Museum of Art
 Portraits of Henry Angelo at the National Portrait Gallery

1756 births
1835 deaths
Henry Charles William
English male fencers